James Alexander Cobey (October 3, 1913 - December 30, 1993) served as California's legislature in 1953 for 12 years as a Democrat, specializing in agriculture, judicial process, fiscal legislation, water and welfare.   He served in the United States Navy during World War II and was appointed Associate Justice in 1966.   In 1973, Los Angeles Trial Lawyers Assn. named him appellate judge of the year.  Then, when he retired in 1981, he taught law at Southwestern University in Los Angeles.

Cobey was born in Frostburg, Maryland and was a graduate of Yale Law School and the Harvard Graduate School of Business, which was a joint program that provided him with a single diploma with both schools' seals on the top of it.  On December 30, 1993, at 80 years old, Cobey died in his home after suffering an extended illness.

References

External links
Join California James A. Cobey

United States Navy personnel of World War II
1913 births
1993 deaths
20th-century American politicians
Yale Law School alumni
Harvard Business School alumni
Military personnel from Maryland
Democratic Party California state senators